Natasha Howard (born 3 September 1980 in Harare) is a British rower. She rowed in the women's eight at the 2008 Summer Olympics but could not row in the finals due to illness. She is a graduate of the University of East Anglia and also studied at the University of British Columbia.

References 
 
 

1980 births
Alumni of the University of East Anglia
University of British Columbia alumni
Zimbabwean people of British descent
Zimbabwean emigrants to the United Kingdom
Living people
British female rowers
Sportspeople from Harare
Rowers at the 2008 Summer Olympics
Olympic rowers of Great Britain
World Rowing Championships medalists for Great Britain